Ernesto Arancibia (12 January 1904 – 27 August 1963) was an Argentine film director and screenwriter.

Filmography

As director
 La novia (1961)
 Azafatas con permiso (1959)
 Y después del cuplé (1959)
 La pícara soñadora (1956)
 Pájaros de cristal (1955)
 La mujer desnuda (1955)
 La calle del pecado (1954)
 La mujer de las camelias (1954)
 The Orchid (1951)
 Romance en tres noches (1950)
 María de los Ángeles (1948)
 La gran tentación (1948)
 Musical Romance (1947)
 Mirad los lirios del campo (1947)
 Lauracha (1946)
 Casa de muñecas (1943)
 Su primer baile (1942)

As screenwriter
 Queen of the Tabarin Club (1960)
 Pájaros de cristal (1955)
 La calle del pecado (1954) 
 La mujer de las camelias (1954)

References

External links

1904 births
1963 deaths
Argentine film directors
Male screenwriters
Writers from Buenos Aires
20th-century Argentine screenwriters
20th-century Argentine male writers